Dmytro Trukhin (born 29 June 1983) is a Ukrainian football midfielder who played for Ukrainian Premier League club Hoverla Uzhhorod.

References

External links

1983 births
Association football defenders
FC Desna Chernihiv players
FC Krymteplytsia Molodizhne players
FC Hoverla Uzhhorod players
Living people
Ukrainian footballers
Ukrainian Premier League players